Shashank Chandrakar (born 13 May 1994) is an Indian cricketer. He made his List A debut for Chhattisgarh in the 2017–18 Vijay Hazare Trophy on 5 February 2018. He made his first-class debut on 3 January 2020, for Chhattisgarh in the 2019–20 Ranji Trophy.

References

External links
 

1994 births
Living people
Indian cricketers
Place of birth missing (living people)
Chhattisgarh cricketers